Knossos (also Cnossos, both pronounced ; , ; Linear B:  Ko-no-so; Linear A: Ku-ni-su) is the largest Bronze Age archaeological site on Crete and has been called Europe's oldest city.

Settled as early as the Neolithic period, the name Knossos survives from ancient Greek references to the major city of Crete. The palace of Knossos eventually became the ceremonial and political centre of the Minoan civilization and culture. The palace was abandoned at some unknown time at the end of the Late Bronze Age, c. 1380–1100 BC; the reason is unknown, but one of the many disasters that befell the palace is generally put forward.

In the First Palace Period (around 2000 BC), the urban area reached a size of as many as 18,000 people.

Spelling

The name Knossos was formerly Latinized as Cnossus or Cnossos and occasionally Knossus, Gnossus, or Gnossos but is now almost always written Knossos.

Neolithic period
The site of Knossos has had a very long history of human habitation beginning with the founding of the first Neolithic settlement (c. 7000 BCE). Neolithic remains are prolific in Crete. They are found in caves, rock shelters, houses, and settlements. Knossos has a thick Neolithic layer indicating the site was a sequence of settlements before the Palace Period. The earliest was placed on bedrock.

Arthur Evans, who unearthed the palace of Knossos in modern times, estimated that c. 8000 BCE a Neolithic people arrived at the hill, probably from overseas by boat, and placed the first of a succession of wattle and daub villages (modern radiocarbon dates have raised the estimate to c. 7000–6500 BCE). Large numbers of clay and stone incised spools and whorls attest to local cloth-making. There are fine ground axe and mace heads of colored stone: greenstone, serpentine, diorite and jadeite, as well as obsidian knives and arrowheads along with the cores from which they were flaked. Most significant among the other small items were a large number of animal and human figurines, including nude sitting or standing females . Evans attributed them to the worship of the Neolithic mother goddess and figurines in general to religion.

Among the items found in Knossos is a Minoan depiction of a goddess flanked by two lionesses that shows a goddess who appears in many other images.

John Davies Evans (no relation to Arthur Evans) undertook further excavations in pits and trenches over the palace, focusing on the Neolithic. In the Aceramic Neolithic, 7000–6000 BCE, a hamlet of 25–50 persons existed at the location of the Central Court. They lived in wattle and daub huts, kept animals, grew crops, and, in the event of tragedy, buried their children under the floor. In such circumstances as they are still seen today, a hamlet consisted of several families, necessarily interrelated, practicing some form of exogamy, living in close quarters, with little or no privacy and a high degree of intimacy, spending most of their time in the outdoors, sheltering only for the night or in inclement weather, and to a large degree nomadic or semi-nomadic.

In the Early Neolithic (6000–5000 BCE), a village of 200–600 persons occupied most of the area of the palace and the slopes to the north and west. They lived in one- or two-room square houses of mud-brick walls set on socles of stone, either field stone or recycled stone artifacts. The inner walls were lined with mud-plaster. The roofs were flat, composed of mud over branches. The residents dug hearths at various locations in the center of the main room. This village had an unusual feature: one house under the West Court contained eight rooms and covered . The walls were at right angles. The door was centered. Large stones were used for support under points of greater stress. The fact that distinct sleeping cubicles for individuals was not the custom suggests storage units of some sort.

The settlement of the Middle Neolithic (5000–4000 BCE), housed 500–1000 people in more substantial and presumably more family-private homes. Construction was the same, except the windows and doors were timbered, a fixed, raised hearth occupied the center of the main room, and pilasters and other raised features (cabinets, beds) occupied the perimeter. Under the palace was the Great House, a  area stone house divided into five rooms with meter-thick walls suggesting a second story was present. The presence of the house, which is unlikely to have been a private residence like the others, suggests a communal or public use; i.e., it may have been the predecessor of a palace. In the Late or Final Neolithic (two different but overlapping classification systems, around 4000–3000 BCE), the population increased dramatically.

Minoan period

It is believed that the first Cretan palaces were built soon after c. 2000 BC, in the early part of the Middle Minoan period, at Knossos and other sites including Mallia, Phaestos and Zakro. These palaces, which were to set the pattern of organisation in Crete and Greece through the second millennium, were a sharp break from the Neolithic village system that had prevailed thus far. The building of the palaces implies greater wealth and a concentration of authority, both political and religious. It is suggested that they followed eastern models such as those at Ugarit on the Syrian coast and Mari on the upper Euphrates.

The early palaces were destroyed during Middle Minoan II, sometime before c. 1700, almost certainly by earthquakes to which Crete is prone. By c. 1650, they had been rebuilt on a grander scale and the period of the second palaces (c. 1650–c. 1450) marks the height of Minoan prosperity. All the palaces had large central courtyards which may have been used for public ceremonies and spectacles. Living quarters, storage rooms and administrative centres were positioned around the court and there were also working quarters for skilled craftsmen.

The palace of Knossos was by far the largest, covering three acres with its main building alone and five acres when separate out-buildings are considered. It had a monumental staircase leading to state rooms on an upper floor. A ritual cult centre was on the ground floor. The palace stores occupied sixteen rooms, the main feature in these being the pithoi that were large storage jars up to five feet tall. They were mainly used for storage of oil, wool, wine, and grain. Smaller and more valuable objects were stored in lead-lined cists. The palace had bathrooms, toilets, and a drainage system. A theatre was found at Knossos that would have held 400 spectators (an earlier one has been found at Phaestos). The orchestral area was rectangular, unlike later Athenian models, and they were probably used for religious dances.

Building techniques at Knossos were typical. The foundations and lower course were stonework with the whole built on a timber framework of beams and pillars. The main structure was built of large, unbaked bricks. The roof was flat with a thick layer of clay over brushwood. Internal rooms were brightened by light-wells and columns of wood, many fluted, were used to lend both support and dignity. The chambers and corridors were decorated with frescoes showing scenes from everyday life and scenes of processions. Warfare is conspicuously absent. The fashions of the time may be seen in depictions of women in various poses. They had elaborately dressed hair and wore long dresses with flounced skirts and puffed sleeves. Their bodices were tightly drawn in round their waists and their breasts were exposed.

The prosperity of Knossos was primarily based upon the development of native Cretan resources such as oil, wine, and wool. Another factor was the expansion of trade. Herodotus wrote that Minos, the legendary king of Knossos, established a thalassocracy (sea empire). Thucydides accepted the tradition and added that Minos cleared the sea of pirates, increased the flow of trade and colonised many Aegean islands. Archaeological evidence supports the tradition because Minoan pottery is widespread, having been found in Egypt, Syria, Anatolia, Rhodes, the Cyclades, Sicily, and mainland Greece. There seem to have been strong Minoan connections with Rhodes, Miletus, and Samos. Cretan influence may be seen in the earliest scripts found in Cyprus. The main market for Cretan wares was the Cyclades where there was a demand for pottery, especially the stone vases. It is not known whether the islands were subject to Crete or just trading partners, but there certainly was strong Cretan influence.

This also applies to the mainland, because both tradition and archaeology indicate strong links between Crete and Athens. The main legend here is the Minotaur story wherein Athens was subject to Knossos and paying tribute. The legend concerns a creature living in a labyrinth who was half-man and half-bull. Bulls are frequently featured on pottery and frescoes found at Knossos, where the intricate layout of the palace might suggest a labyrinth. One of the most common cult-symbols, often seen on palace walls, is the double-headed axe called the labrys, which is a Carian word for that type of tool or weapon.

At the height of Cretan power around 1450 BC, the palaces at Mallia, Phaestus, and Zakro were destroyed along with smaller settlements elsewhere. Only Knossos remained and it survived until c. 1370. At the time of its destruction, it was occupied by Greeks, whose presence is suggested by a new emphasis on weapons and warfare in both art and burial. Mycenaean-style chamber tombs had been adopted and there was mainland influence on pottery styles. Confirmation came in written form after Michael Ventris deciphered the Linear B tablets and showed the language to be an early form of Greek that was quite unlike the earlier Linear A. Sir Arthur Evans found the Linear B tablets at Knossos and, although the writing was different from the Linear A ones at Phaestus and elsewhere, he thought they were a development of the first and so called them Linear B.

Despite speculation that Knossos was destroyed by the volcanic eruption on Santorini, it is generally accepted that the cause was human violence following an invasion of Crete by Greeks from the Argolid, most probably Mycenaean. Knossos was still prosperous at the time of its destruction c. 1370 with trade and art continuing to thrive. Explanations for its destruction are speculative, but a likely reason is that the Mycenaeans, now prospering on the mainland, decided to remove a rival power.

Legends

In Greek mythology, King Minos dwelt in a palace at Knossos. He had Daedalus construct a labyrinth, a very large maze (by some connected with the double-bladed axe, or labrys) in which to retain his son, the Minotaur. Daedalus also built a dancing floor for Queen Ariadne. The name "Knossos" was subsequently adopted by Arthur Evans.

As far as is currently known, it was William Stillman, the American consul who published Kalokairinos' discoveries, who, seeing the sign of the double axe on the massive walls partly uncovered by Kalokairinos, first associated the complex with the labyrinth of legend, calling the ruins "labyrinthine." Evans agreed with Stillman. The myth of the Minotaur tells that Theseus, a prince from Athens, whose father was an ancient Greek king named Aegeus, the basis for the name of the Greek sea (the Aegean Sea), sailed to Crete, where he was forced to fight a terrible creature called the Minotaur. The Minotaur was a half man, half bull, and was kept in the Labyrinth – a building like a maze – by King Minos, the ruler of Crete. The king's daughter, Ariadne, fell in love with Theseus. Before he entered the Labyrinth to fight the Minotaur, Ariadne gave him a ball of thread which he unwound as he went into the Labyrinth so that he could find his way back by following it. Theseus killed the Minotaur, and then he and Ariadne fled from Crete, escaping her angry father.

As it turns out, there probably was an association of the word labyrinth, whatever its etymology, with ancient Crete. The sign of the double axe was used throughout the Mycenaean world as an apotropaic mark: its presence on an object would prevent it from being "killed". Axes were scratched on many of the stones of the palace. It appears in pottery decoration and is a motif of the Shrine of the Double Axes at the palace, as well as of many shrines throughout Crete and the Aegean. And finally, it appears in Linear B on Knossos Tablet Gg702 as da-pu2-ri-to-jo po-ti-ni-ja, which probably represents the Mycenaean Greek, Daburinthoio potniai, "to the mistress of the Labyrinth," recording the distribution of one jar of honey. A credible theory uniting all the evidence has yet to be formulated.

Laws and government

Rhadamanthus was the mythological lawgiver of Crete. Cleinias of Crete attributes to him the tradition of Cretan gymnasia and common meals in Book I of Plato's Laws, and describes the logic of the custom as enabling a constant state of war readiness.

Hellenistic and Roman period 

Fieldwork in 2015 revealed that during the early Iron Age, Knossos was rich in imports and was nearly three times larger than indicated by earlier excavations. Whilst archaeologists had previously believed that the city had declined in the wake of a socio-political collapse around 1,200 BC, the work found instead, that the city had prospered, with its final abandonment coming later.

After the fall of the Minoans, Knossus was repopulated approximately 1000 BC and it remained one of the most important centers of Crete. The city had two ports: Amnisos and Heraklion. According to the ancient geographer Strabo the Knossians colonized the city of Brundisium in Italy. In 343 BC, Knossos was allied with Philip II of Macedon. The city employed a Phocian mercenary named Phalaikos against their enemy, the city of Lyttus. The Lyttians appealed to the Spartans who sent their king Archidamus III against the Knossians. In Hellenistic times Knossos came under Egyptian influence, but despite considerable military efforts during the Chremonidean War (267–261 BC), the Ptolemies were not able to unify the warring city states. In the third century BC Knossos expanded its power to dominate almost the entire island, but during the Lyttian War in 220 BC it was checked by a coalition led by the Polyrrhenians and the Macedonian king Philip V.

Twenty years later, during the Cretan War (205–200 BC), the Knossians were once more among Philip's opponents and, through Roman and Rhodian aid, this time they managed to liberate Crete from the Macedonian influence. With Roman aid, Knossus became once more the first city of Crete, but, in 67 BC, the Roman Senate chose Gortys as the capital of the newly created province Creta et Cyrene. In 36 BC, Knossus became a Roman colony named Colonia Iulia Nobilis. The colony, which was built using Roman-style architecture, was situated within the vicinity of the palace, but only a small part of it has been excavated.

The identification of Knossos with the Bronze Age site is supported by the Roman coins that were scattered over the fields surrounding the pre-excavation site, then a large mound named Kephala Hill, elevation  from current sea level. Many of them were inscribed with Knosion or Knos on the obverse and an image of a Minotaur or Labyrinth on the reverse. The coins came from the Roman settlement of Colonia Julia Nobilis Cnossus, a Roman colony placed just to the north of, and politically including, Kephala. The Romans believed they were the first to colonize Knossos.

During the ninth century AD the local population shifted to the new town of Chandax (modern Heraklion). By the thirteenth century, it was called Makruteikhos 'Long Wall'.

Today, the name is used only for the archaeological site now situated in the expanding suburbs of Heraklion.

Ecclesiastical history 

In 325, Knossos became a diocese, suffragan of the metropolitan see of Gortyna. In Ottoman Crete, the see of Knossos was in Agios Myron, 14 km to the southwest. The bishops of Gortyn continued to call themselves bishops of Knossos until the nineteenth century. The diocese was abolished in 1831.

Discovery and modern history of the antiquities

The site of Knossos was discovered in 1878 by Minos Kalokairinos. The excavations in Knossos began in 1900 by the British archaeologist Sir Arthur Evans (1851–1941) and his team, and continued for 35 years. Its size far exceeded his original expectations, as did the discovery of two ancient scripts, which he termed Linear A and Linear B, to distinguish their writing from the pictographs also present. From the layering of the palace Evans developed an archaeological concept of the civilization that used it, which he called Minoan, following the pre-existing custom of labelling all objects from the location Minoan.

Since their discovery, the ruins have been the centre of excavation by renowned archaeologists, education, tourism, and occupation as a headquarters by governments warring over the control of the eastern Mediterranean in two world wars.

Palace complex

The features of the palace depend on the time period. Currently visible is an accumulation of features over several centuries, the latest most dominant. Thus, the palace was never exactly as depicted today. In addition, it has been reconstituted in modern materials. The custom began in an effort to preserve the site from decay and torrential winter rain. After 1922, the chief proprietor, Arthur Evans, intended to recreate a facsimile based on archaeological evidence. The palace is not exactly as it ever was, perhaps in places, not even close, and yet in general, judging from the work put in and the care taken, as well as parallels with other palaces, it probably is a good general facsimile. Opinions range, however, from most skeptical, viewing the palace as pure fantasy based on 1920s architecture and art deco, to most unquestioning, accepting the final judgements of Arthur Evans as most accurate. The mainstream of opinion falls between.

Location

From an archaeological point of view, the terms "Knossos" and "palace" are somewhat ambiguous. The palace was never just the residence of a monarch, although it contained rooms that might have been suitable for a royal family. Most of the structures, however, were designed to serve a civic, religious, and economic center. The term palace complex is more accurate. In ancient times, Knossos was a town surrounding and including the Kephala. This hill was never an acropolis in the Greek sense. It had no steep heights, remained unfortified, and was not very high off the surrounding ground. These circumstances cannot necessarily be imputed to other Minoan palaces. Phaistos, contemporaneous with Knossos, was placed on a steep ridge, controlling access to the Messara Plain from the sea, and was walled. To what degree Minoan civilization might be considered warlike remains debatable. It can, however, be said that Knossos bore no resemblance to a Mycenaean citadel, whether before or during Mycenaean Greek occupation.

The complex was constructed ultimately around a raised central court on the top of Kephala. The previous structures were razed and the top was made level to make way for the court. The court is oblong, with the long axis, which points north-northeast, generally described as pointing "north". Plot plans typically show the court with the long axis horizontal, apparently east-west with the north on the right, or vertical with the north on the top. Either arrangement is confusing unless the compass points are carefully marked. About  to the north of the palace complex is the sea at the Port of Heraklion. Directly to the south is Vlychia Stream, an east-west tributary of the north-south Kairatos. Kephala is an isolated hill at the confluence.

The Kairatos River reaches the sea between the modern port of Heraklion and Heraklion Airport to the east. In ancient times the flow continued without interruption. Today the stream loses itself in the sewers of Heraklion before emerging from under a highway on the shore east of the port. It flows down from higher ground at Arkhanes to the south, where part of it was diverted into the Knossos Aqueduct. The water at that point was clean enough for drinking. When it reached Knossos it became the main drain of the sewer system of a town of up to 100,000 people, according to Pendlebury's estimate. Today the population is mainly to the north, but the sewer function continues, in addition to which much of the river is siphoned off, and the water table is tapped for irrigation. Looming over the right bank of the Vlychia, on the opposite shore from Knossos, is Gypsades Hill, where the Minoans quarried their gypsum. The limestone was quarried from the ridge on the east.

The archaeological site, Knossos, refers either to the palace complex or, to that complex and several houses of similar antiquity nearby, which were inadvertently excavated along with the palace. To the south across the Vlychia is the Caravanserai. Further to the south are Minoan houses. The Minoan Road crossed the Vlychia on a Minoan Bridge, immediately entering the Stepped Portico, or covered stairway, to the palace complex. Near the northwest corner of the complex are the ruins of the House of the Frescoes. Across the Minoan Road entering from the northwest is the Arsenal. On the north side of the palace is the Customs House and the Northeast House. From there to the northeast is the modern village of Makrotoichos. Between it and the palace complex is the Royal Villa. On the west side is the Little Palace.

The Royal Road is the last vestige of a Minoan road that connected the port to the palace complex. Today a modern road, Leoforos Knosou, built over or replacing the ancient roadway, serves that function and continues south. The excavated ancient Royal Road is part of the complex. The junction of the ancient and the modern roads is partly over the Little Palace. Just to the northwest of there, off the modern road, is where Evans chose to have Villa Ariadne built as his home away from home and an administrative center. The villa is on a slope overlooking the ruins. At the edge of the property, on the road, is a pre-excavation house renovated many times as a residence for the official keeper, called the Taverna. Immediately to the south of the villa, over parts of the Little Palace, is the modern Stratigraphical Museum, a square building. Excavation continues sporadically on its grounds. To the south of the museum is a modern settlement across from the entrance to the west court. Parking facilities are to the north, off Leoforos Knosou. A band of fields has been left on the northwest between the palace complex and the city streets of Heraklion. The east and west are protected by north-south mountain ridges, between which is the valley of the Kairatos.

General features

The great palace was built gradually between 1700 and 1400 BC, with periodic rebuildings after destructions. Structures preceded it on Kephala hill. The features currently most visible date mainly to the last period of habitation, which Evans termed, Late Minoan. The palace has an interesting layout  – the original plan can no longer be seen due to the subsequent modifications. The 1,300 rooms are connected with corridors of varying sizes and direction, which differ from other contemporaneous palaces that connected the rooms via several main hallways. The  of the palace included a theater, a main entrance on each of its four cardinal faces, and extensive storerooms (also called magazines). Within the storerooms were large clay containers (pithoi) that held oil, grains, dried fish, beans, and olives. Many of the items were processed at the palace, which had grain mills, oil presses, and wine presses. Beneath the pithoi were stone holes that were used to store more valuable objects, such as gold. The palace used advanced architectural techniques: for example, part of it was built up to five stories high.

Water management
The palace had at least three separate water-management systems: one for supply, one for drainage of runoff, and one for drainage of waste water.

Aqueducts brought fresh water to Kephala hill from springs at Archanes, about 10 km away. Springs there are the source of the Kairatos river, in the valley in which Kephala is located. The aqueduct branched to the palace and to the town. Water was distributed at the palace by gravity feed through terracotta pipes to fountains and spigots. The pipes were tapered at one end to make a pressure fit, with rope for sealing. Unlike Mycenae, no hidden springs have been discovered.

Sanitation drainage was through a closed system leading to a sewer apart from the hill. The queen's megaron contained an example of the first known water-flushing system latrine adjoining the bathroom. This toilet was a seat over a drain that was flushed by pouring water from a jug. The bathtub located in the adjoining bathroom similarly had to be filled by someone heating, carrying, and pouring water, and must have been drained by overturning into a floor drain or by bailing. This toilet and bathtub were exceptional structures within the 1,300-room complex.

As the hill was periodically drenched by torrential rains, a runoff system was a necessity. It began with channels in the flat surfaces, which were zigzag and contained catchment basins to control the water velocity. Probably the upper system was open. Manholes provided access to parts that were covered.

Some links to photographs of parts of the water-collection-management system follow.
Runoff system. Sloped channels lead from a catchment basin.
Runoff system. Note the zig-zags and the catchment basin.

Ventilation
Due to its placement on the hill, the palace received sea breezes during the summer. It had porticoes and air shafts.

Minoan columns
The palace also includes the Minoan column, a structure notably different from Greek columns. Unlike the stone columns that are characteristic of Greek architecture, the Minoan column was constructed from the trunk of a cypress tree, which is common to the Mediterranean. While Greek columns are smaller at the top and wider at the bottom to create the illusion of greater height (entasis), the Minoan columns are smaller at the bottom and wider at the top, a result of inverting the cypress trunk to prevent sprouting once in place. The columns at the Palace of Minos were plastered, painted red and mounted on stone bases with round, pillow-like capitals.

Pottery

Pottery at Knossos is prolific, heavily-decorated and uniquely-styled by period. It is used as a layer diagnostic. Comparing it to similar pottery elsewhere in the eastern Mediterranean, Evans established a wider chronology, which, on that account, is difficult to question successfully. On the negative side, careful records of the locations of some objects were not always kept, due to the very size of the project and the difficulties under which the archaeologists and workmen had to labor.

Frescoes

The palace at Knossos was a place of high color, as were Greek buildings in the classical period, and as are Greek buildings today. In the EM Period, the walls and pavements were coated with a pale red derived from red ochre. In addition to the background coloring, the walls displayed fresco panel murals, entirely of red. In the subsequent MM Period, with the development of the art, white and black were added, and then blue, green, and yellow. The pigments were derived from natural materials, such as ground hematite. Outdoor panels were painted on fresh stucco with the motif in relief; indoor, on fresh, pure plaster, softer than the plaster with additives ordinarily used on walls.

The decorative motifs were generally bordered scenes: humans, legendary creatures, animals, rocks, vegetation, and marine life. The earliest imitated pottery motifs. Most have been reconstructed from various numbers of flakes fallen to the floor. Evans had various technicians and artists work on the project, some artists, some chemists, and restorers. The symmetry and use of templates made possible a degree of reconstruction beyond what was warranted by only the flakes. For example, if evidence of the use of a certain template existed scantily in one place, the motif could be supplied from the template found somewhere else. Like the contemporary murals in the funerary art of the Egyptians, certain conventions were used that also assisted prediction. For example, male figures are shown with darker or redder skin than female figures.

Some archaeological authors have objected that Evans and his restorers were not discovering the palace and civilization as it was, but were creating a modern artifact based on contemporary art and architecture.

Throne Room

The centerpiece of the "Minoan" palace was the so-called Throne Room or Little Throne Room, dated to LM II. This chamber has an alabaster seat identified by Evans as a "throne" built into the north wall. On three sides of the room are gypsum benches. A sort of tub area is opposite the throne, behind the benches, termed a lustral basin, which means that Evans and his team saw it as a place for ceremonial purification.

The room was accessed from an anteroom through double doors. The anteroom was connected to the central court, which was four steps up through four doors. The anteroom had gypsum benches also, with carbonized remains between two of them thought possibly, to be a wooden throne. Both rooms are located in the ceremonial complex on the west of the central court.

The throne is flanked by the Griffin Fresco, with two griffins couchant (lying down) facing the throne, one on either side. Griffins were important mythological creatures, also appearing on seal rings, which were used to stamp the identities of the bearers into pliable material, such as clay or wax.

The actual use of the room and the throne is unclear.

The two main theories are as follows:

 The seat of a priest-king or a queen. This is the older theory, originating with Evans. In that regard Matz speaks of the "heraldic arrangement" of the griffins, meaning that they are more formal and monumental than previous Minoan decorative styles. In this theory, the Mycenaeans would have held court in this room, as they came to power in Knossos at about 1,450. The "lustral basin" and the location of the room in a sanctuary complex cannot be ignored; hence, "priest-king".
 A room reserved for the epiphany of a goddess, who would have sat in the throne, either in effigy, or in the person of a priestess, or in imagination only. In that case the griffins would have been purely a symbol of divinity rather than a heraldic motif.

Additional speculation is, since the indentation of the seat seems to be shaped for a woman's buttocks, that the throne was made specifically for a female individual. Also, the extensive use of curved edges and the crescent moon carved at its base both symbolize femininity.

The lustral basin was originally thought to have had a ritual washing use, but the lack of drainage has more recently brought some scholars to doubt this theory. It is now speculated that the tank was used as an aquarium, or possibly a water reservoir.

Society

A long-standing debate between archaeologists concerns the main function of the palace, whether it acted as an administrative center, a religious center, or both, in a theocratic manner. Other important debates consider the role of Knossos in the administration of Bronze Age Crete, and whether Knossos acted as the primary center, or was on equal footing with the several other contemporaneous palaces that have been discovered on Crete. Many of these palaces were destroyed and abandoned in the early part of the fifteenth century BC, possibly by the Mycenaeans, although Knossos remained in use until it was destroyed by fire about one hundred years later. Knossos showed no signs of being a military site; for example, it had neither fortifications nor stores of weapons.

Notable residents
 Aenesidemus (first century BC), sceptical philosopher
 Chersiphron (sixth century BC), architect
 Epimenides (sixth century BC), seer and philosopher-poet
 Ergoteles of Himera (fifth century BC), expatriate Olympic runner
 Metagenes (6th century BC), architect
 Minos (mythical), father of the Minotaur

See also
 Magasa
 Trapeza

Citations

General and cited sources

 
 
 
 Benton, Janetta Rebold and Robert DiYanni.Arts and Culture: An introduction to the Humanities, Volume 1 (Prentice Hall. New Jersey, 1998), 64–70.
 Bourbon, F. Lost Civilizations (New York,  Barnes and Noble, 1998), 30–35.
 
 
 
 
 
 
 
 
 
 
 
 
 
 
 
 
 
 
 
 
 
 Landenius Enegren, Hedvig. The People of Knossos: prosopographical studies in the Knossos Linear B archives (Uppsala: Acta Universitatis Upsaliensis, 2008) (Boreas. Uppsala studies in ancient Mediterranean and Near Eastern civilizations, 30).

External links

 
 
 

 
Populated places established in the 7th millennium BC
1878 archaeological discoveries
Aegean palaces of the Bronze Age
Cretan city-states
Former populated places in Greece
Heraklion
Minoan sites in Crete
Minoan civilization
Articles containing video clips
Populated places in ancient Crete
Neolithic settlements in Crete